Callistege futilis is a moth of the family Erebidae. It was described from the Apfel Mountains.

References

Moths described in 1897
Callistege
Taxa named by Otto Staudinger